This is a list of flag bearers who have represented Guinea-Bissau at the Olympics.

Flag bearers carry the national flag of their country at the opening ceremony of the Olympic Games.

See also
Guinea-Bissau at the Olympics

References

Flag bearers
Guinea-Bissau
Olympic flagbearers